The Kumanovska Reka ("Kumanovo River") is a small river situated in the north-east part of North Macedonia.

It flows mainly through the city of Kumanovo. The Kumanovska Reka is a right tributary of river Pčinja.

Rivers of North Macedonia